Kaumudy TV is a Malayalam language free to air television channel owned by the owners of the Malayalam daily newspaper Kerala Kaumudi. The channel was officially launched on 5 May 2013. Prime Minister Manmohan Singh had already unveiled the logo of the channel a year earlier during the centenary celebrations of Kerala Kaumudi. The program menu comprises news, talks, interviews and entertainment.

Satellite information

Programming
 Aliyans
Mahaguru
Oh My God
Snake Master – Vava Suresh
Day with a Star
Devamrutham
Secret File
4 the people
Haritha sundaram
Salt and Pepper
Junior Chef Master
Sadhguru Jaggi Vasudev – Mystical Wisdom
Puthiya Pattu
Film Box 
Dream Drive
Get set Chat
Saat
Tharappakittu
Ladies Hour
Straight Line
Arangaettam
Devageetham

Gulf News
News @ Gulf – UAE – 9.50 pm, KSA – 8.50 pm, India 11.25 pm  News reported by Nibin Navas

References

24-hour television news channels in India
Malayalam-language television channels
Television stations in Thiruvananthapuram
Television channels and stations established in 2013
2013 establishments in Kerala